Asura ila is a moth of the family Erebidae. It is found in India and Sri Lanka.

Description
Its wingspan is about 22 mm. Antennae of male ciliated. Sub-basal and postmedial bands of the forewings are reduced to a series of specks. Medial band is broad, regular and nearly erect. The marginal series of specks present.

References

ila
Moths described in 1859
Moths of Asia
Moths of Sri Lanka